Hans Schlottheim (1545–1625) was a goldsmith and clockmaker active in Augsburg, Germany, now best known for his clockwork automata.

References 

 British Museum
 Artsy.net

German clockmakers
1545 births
1625 deaths